Remixes 2: 81–11 is a remix compilation album by English electronic music band Depeche Mode, released on 6 June 2011 by Mute Records. The album is the band's second remix collection, following Remixes 81–04 (2004). It spans the band's entire career up that point and includes new arrangements by former Depeche Mode members Vince Clarke and Alan Wilder. The compilation concludes the band's recording contract with EMI.

The album is available in two different CD formats, single or triple-disc, as well as digital downloads and a six-LP box set. The album was preceded by the single "Personal Jesus 2011", with the leading remix of "Personal Jesus" by the Norwegian production team Stargate. Clarke's remix of "Behind the Wheel", titled "Behind the Wheel 2011", was released as a promotional single in the United States on 6 June 2011.

The version of the album available through Beatport replaces 10 of the tracks on the album with either instrumental or dub versions and features a different cover art.

Track listing
All songs written and composed by Martin L. Gore, except where noted.

One-disc version

Three-disc version

Personnel
Credits adapted from the liner notes of Remixes 2: 81–11.

 Depeche Mode – compilers
 Roland Brown – compiler
 Mike Marsh – mastering
 Mat Cook – design

Charts

Weekly charts

Year-end charts

References

External links
 Album information from the official Depeche Mode website
 

2011 compilation albums
2011 remix albums
Depeche Mode compilation albums
Depeche Mode remix albums
Mute Records compilation albums
Mute Records remix albums
Reprise Records compilation albums
Reprise Records remix albums